Rok Drašler (born 26 May 1979) is a Slovenian cyclist. He competed in the men's cross-country mountain biking event at the 2000 Summer Olympics.

References

1979 births
Living people
Slovenian male cyclists
Olympic cyclists of Slovenia
Cyclists at the 2000 Summer Olympics
Sportspeople from Ljubljana